The White Heather is a lost 1919 American silent drama film directed by Maurice Tourneur and starring Holmes Herbert, Ben Alexander and Ralph Graves. It was based on an 1897  play of the same title by Cecil Raleigh and Henry Hamilton. The future matinee idol John Gilbert appeared in a supporting part.

Plot
As described in a film magazine, Lord Angus Cameron (played by Herbert) of the White Heather country finds himself seriously embarrassed financially during a stock exchange panic and goes to Donald Cameron (Alexander) on his country estate for a loan. Donald refuses because Angus will not contract a favorable marriage with one of his class. With ruin facing him, Angus decides to rid himself of a secret marriage made with his housekeeper Marion Hume (Ballin) on his yacht before it was sunk. Documentary evidence of the marriage now lies many fathoms underwater, and one witness is dead while another, a sailor, has vanished on some voyage. During a hunt Angus accidentally shoots his son from the marriage, leading Marion to announce it to save her injured son. Angus denies the marriage, so Marion goes to her father James Hume (Aitken), while two admirers of Marion hunt for the missing witness in the London underworld. Her father fights for his daughter's honor in court, but the case is lost for lack of evidence, and he is ruined on the exchange, dying when he is unable to meet his liabilities. When the missing witness is found, Angus bribes him to disappear. There remain only the papers in a chest on the sunken yacht, and diving operations are ongoing. The two admirers and Lord Angus hasten to the scene. One of the admirers dives on the yacht as does Angus armed with a knife. During an underwater struggle Angus accidentally cuts his own air hose and is killed. The admirer returns to the surface with the proof of the marriage and claims Marion for himself, while the second admirer dies while also confessing his love.

Cast
 Holmes Herbert as Lord Angus Cameron
 Ben Alexander as Donald Cameron
 Ralph Graves as Alec McClintock
 Mabel Ballin as Marion Hume
 John Gilbert as Dick Beach
 Spottiswoode Aitken as James Hume

References

Bibliography
 Waldman, Harry. Maurice Tourneur: The Life and Films. McFarland, 2008.

External links

1919 films
1919 drama films
Silent American drama films
1910s English-language films
Lost American films
Films directed by Maurice Tourneur
American silent feature films
Films set in London
Films set in England
Films set in Scotland
American films based on plays
American black-and-white films
Underwater action films
1919 lost films
Lost drama films
1910s American films
Silent adventure films